Pseudomulleria dalyi is a species of bivalves in the Etheriidae family. It is endemic to India.  Its natural habitat is rivers. It is threatened by habitat loss. It is the only species in the genus Pseudomulleria.

References

Etheriidae
Monotypic mollusc genera
Taxonomy articles created by Polbot